Bafa it a traditional dish of the Capeverdean cuisine.

It consists of a stew that can be prepared with limpets, whelks and octopus.

It can be eaten as a snack, as an entrée, or as a main dish.

A variant named Octopus bafa (Bafa de polvo).

See also
Cape Verdean cuisine

References

Cape Verdean cuisine
Seafood dishes